The Association for Assessment and Accreditation of Laboratory Animal Care International, or AAALAC, is a private, nonprofit organization that promotes the humane treatment of animals in science through voluntary accreditation and assessment programs. The program started in 1965, when leading veterinarians and researchers organized the American Association for Accreditation of Laboratory Animal Care, or AAALAC. In 1996, AAALAC changed its name to the Association for Assessment and Accreditation of Laboratory Animal Care International (AAALAC International). The name change reflects the organization's growth in other countries, and its commitment to enhancing life sciences and quality animal care around the world. Today, more than 900 organizations worldwide are accredited.

Along with meeting all applicable local and national regulations, AAALAC accredited institutions must also demonstrate that they are achieving the standards outlined in the Guide for the Care and Use of Laboratory Animals (National Research Council, 1996). The standards in the Guide go above and beyond what is required by law. One book, The Guide for the Care and Use of Laboratory Animals serves as the basic standard represented by AAALAC accreditation. The Guide is written by the National Research Council of the U.S. National Academy of Sciences.

See also
Animal welfare
Animal testing
American Association for Laboratory Animal Science
Animal Welfare Act of 1966
Food Security Act of 1985
in vivo

References

Animal testing
Animal welfare organizations based in the United States
Research methods
Laboratory animals
Accreditation organizations